In Ghana, an Outdooring (Ga: kpodziemo) is the traditional naming ceremony for infants. Traditionally this ceremony occurs eight days after the child is born where parents bring their newborn "outdoors" for the first time and give the child a day name. Cultural beliefs dictated that after eight days, the infant was likely to survive and could be provided a name. In addition to the day name, Ghanaians frequently give children a name of an elder relative, either living or deceased. During the Outdooring, male infants would be circumcised and female infants would have their ears pierced 
Currently in Ghana, many of these practices including naming, circumcision, and ear piercing are done after birth within the hospital, and the Outdooring serves as a symbolic ceremony and celebration of birth.

Although most Ghanaian ethnic groups conduct Outdooring ceremonies, the practices differ slightly. Among the Akan, babies would be raised toward the sky three times as an introduction to heaven and earth. Among the Ga, drops of water and alcohol are placed on the child's tongues to symbolically represent good versus evil. Libations are also poured as protection over the child.

After being given a name, friends and family provide gifts to the baby which is then followed by a feast. Outdoorings are now very syncretic as Ghana's population has adopted Christianity or Islam. Christian Ghanaians will often give their children both Christian and Ghanaian names, while in Muslim communities a mallam suggests several names for the parents to choose from.

References

Ghanaian culture
Circumcision
Naming ceremonies
Akan culture